Sulibele  is a village in the southern state of Karnataka, India. It is located in the Hosakote taluk of Bangalore Rural district.

Demographics
 India census, Sulibele had a population of 8205 with 4244 males and 3961 females.

See also
 Bangalore Rural
 Districts of Karnataka

References

External links
 http://Bangalorerural.nic.in/

Villages in Bangalore Rural district